The Ogasawara Whale Watching Association is an association that regulates whale watching in the Ogasawara Islands. Since 1989 the Ogasawara Whale Watching Association has been conducting research on and educating people about whales. The Ogasawara Whale Watching Association also offers whale watching tours.

On September 30, 2004, researchers from the National Science Museum of Japan and the Ogasawara Whale Watching Association took the first images of a live giant squid in its natural habitat. Several of the 556 photographs were released a year later. The same team successfully filmed a live giant squid for the first time on December 4, 2006.

References 

Cetacean research and conservation
Natural history of the Bonin Islands
Animal welfare organizations based in Japan
Oceanographic organizations